In immunology, the Arthus reaction is a type of local type III hypersensitivity reaction.  Type III hypersensitivity reactions are immune complex-mediated, and involve the deposition of antigen/antibody complexes mainly in the vascular walls, serosa (pleura, pericardium, synovium), and glomeruli. This reaction is usually encountered in experimental settings following the injection of antigens.

History
The Arthus reaction was discovered by Nicolas Maurice Arthus in 1903. Arthus repeatedly injected horse serum subcutaneously into rabbits.  After four injections, he found that there was edema and that the serum was absorbed slowly.  Further injections eventually led to gangrene.

Process
The Arthus reaction involves the in situ formation of antigen/antibody complexes after the intradermal injection of an antigen.  If the animal/patient was previously sensitized (has circulating antibody), an Arthus reaction occurs. Typical of most mechanisms of the type III hypersensitivity, Arthus manifests as local vasculitis due to deposition of IgG-based immune complexes in dermal blood vessels.  Activation of complement primarily results in cleavage of soluble complement proteins forming C5a and C3a, which activate recruitment of PMNs and local mast cell degranulation (requiring the binding of the immune complex onto FcγRIII), resulting in an inflammatory response. Further aggregation of immune complex-related processes induce a local fibrinoid necrosis with ischemia-aggravating thrombosis in the tissue vessel walls. The end result is a localized area of redness and induration that typically lasts a day or so.

Arthus reactions have been infrequently reported after vaccinations containing diphtheria and tetanus toxoid. The CDC's description:
Arthus reactions (type III hypersensitivity reactions) are rarely reported after vaccination and can occur after tetanus toxoid–containing or diphtheria toxoid–containing vaccines.  An Arthus reaction is a local vasculitis associated with deposition of immune complexes and activation of complement. Immune complexes form in the setting of high local concentration of vaccine antigens and high circulating antibody concentration.  Arthus reactions are characterized by severe pain, swelling, induration, edema, hemorrhage, and occasionally by necrosis. These symptoms and signs usually occur 4–12 hours after vaccination. ACIP has recommended that persons who experienced an Arthus reaction after a dose of tetanus toxoid–containing vaccine should not receive Td more frequently than every 10 years, even for tetanus prophylaxis as part of wound management.

See also
 Serum sickness

References

External links 

Immune system disorders